The Platyrhinidae are a family of rays, commonly known as thornbacks due to their dorsal rows of large thorns. They resemble guitarfishes in shape. Though traditionally classified with stingrays, molecular evidence suggests they are more closely related to electric rays in the order Torpediniformes.

Genera and species
 Genus Platyrhina J. P. Müller & Henle, 1838
 Platyrhina hyugaensis Iwatsuki, Miyamoto & Nakaya, 2011 (Hyuga fanray)
 Platyrhina sinensis Bloch & J. G. Schneider, 1801 (fanray)
 Platyrhina tangi Iwatsuki, J. Zhang & Nakaya, 2011 (yellow-spotted fanray)
 Genus Platyrhinoidis Garman 1881
 Platyrhinoidis triseriata D. S. Jordan & Gilbert, 1880 (thornback guitarfish)

References
 

Myliobatiformes
Ray families
Taxa named by David Starr Jordan